Carol Ann Alvarado (born October 26, 1967) is the state senator for Texas's 6th state senate district. The district includes southeast Houston, and portions of Pasadena. She is a member of the Democratic Party. On December 11, 2018, Alvarado won a special election to fill the Senate seat for the 6th district left vacant by the resignation of Sylvia Garcia, who was elected to the U.S. House of Representatives.

Early life and education
Carol Alvarado is a native Houstonian and a longtime resident of Houston's East End. Her political activism began at the age of 12, when she assisted her godfather's campaign for the Houston City Council District I. Prior to formally entering public life, Alvarado worked in City Hall as a Senior Executive Assistant to Houston Mayor Lee P. Brown. Her past professional experience includes serving as a legislative assistant to Congressman Gene Green in Washington D.C., and as a consultant in economic and community development in East End neighborhoods.

Alvarado is a graduate of the University of Houston, and holds a Bachelor of Arts degree in Political Science. She received her MBA from the University of Houston in December 2008.

Political career

City Council
Alvarado served on the Houston City Council, District I, from 2002-2007.  During her time on the City Council, Alvarado worked to close down nuisance bars in neighborhoods, improve air quality, and secure cameras at problem rail crossings. She was instrumental in the creation of the Parking Commission, and led the effort to establish a deed restriction database. Alvarado also spearheaded the Houston city ordinance that bans smoking in public restaurants and bars.

State House
In 2008, Alvarado was elected to Texas House of Representatives. She currently resides as the Co-Chair of the Transparency in State Agency Operations committee, the Vice-Chair of the Urban Affairs committee, and as a member of the House Calendars and Special Purpose Districts committees.

Alvarado's primary legislative focus has been on public health, public education, and economic development issues. During her three terms in the House, she has authored bills to qualify all Texas four-year-olds for pre-kindergarten, to increase career and technology education funding, to limit elementary class sizes, and to freeze tuition at public colleges and universities.  She has also authored legislation that would limit the use of sugary drinks in public schools, increase physical education and health education graduation requirements, and ban the use of trans fats by fast food chains.

An advocate of women's health issues, Alvarado received media attention in 2011 during the debate of House Bill 15, a mandatory sonogram bill. Speaking on the floor of the House chamber, Alvarado displayed a 10-inch trans vaginal wand and described the intrusiveness of the sonogram procedure.

In 2021, Alvarado engaged in a 15-hour filibuster to prevent the Republican-controlled Texas Senate from passing legislation to restrict voting rights. Filibusters in Texas require continuous standing and speaking.

References

External links

 
 Campaign website

1967 births
21st-century American politicians
21st-century American women politicians
Hispanic and Latino American state legislators in Texas
Hispanic and Latino American women in politics
Houston City Council members
Living people
Democratic Party members of the Texas House of Representatives
University of Houston alumni
Women city councillors in Texas
Women state legislators in Texas